The following lists events that happened during 1998 in the Grand Duchy of Luxembourg.

Incumbents

Events

January – March
 30 January – Marc Fischbach and Johny Lahure resign from the government, and are replaced by Luc Frieden and Georges Wohlfart.

April – June
 28 April – Grand Duke Jean declares his eldest son, Hereditary Grand Duke Henri, to be his Lieutenant Representative.
 23 May – CS Grevenmacher win the Luxembourg Cup, beating FC Avenir Beggen 2–0 in the final.
 28-29 May – NATO Foreign Ministers meet in Luxembourg City.
 1 June – The Banque Centrale du Luxembourg is established.
 14 June – The United States' Lance Armstrong wins the 1998 Tour de Luxembourg.

July – September
 30 August – SES launches its eighth satellite, Astra 2A.
 27 September – The 1998 Luxembourg Grand Prix is held: not in Luxembourg, but at the Nürburgring, in the nearby German town of Nürburg.

October – December
 5 November – The Saint Esprit Tunnel is officially renamed the 'René Konen Tunnel' after former Democratic Party politician René Konen.
 31 December – The exchange rate between the Luxembourgian franc and the ECU at close of trading is 40.3399.  This rate is then fixed as the level at which Luxembourg would join the Euro.

Births

Deaths
 28 February – Elsy Jacobs, cyclist
 30 September – Émile Krieps, politician and resistance leader

References

 
Years of the 20th century in Luxembourg
Luxembourg